Bagher Ardeshir Larijani (born May 1961) is an Iranian medical practitioner (Professor of Internal Medicine and Endocrinology) at Tehran University of Medical Sciences. He is currently Chief Scientific Officer and Director General of the Endocrinology and Metabolism Research Institute (EMRI) which has been selected as the highest-ranking research institute in Iran on numerous occasions. According to Google Scholar, in February 2020, his citations exceeded 28021 with an h-index equal to 73. Since 2011, Essential Sciences Indicators (ESI) of ISI Web of Sciences has announced him to be amongst the world’s top 1% scientists. Professor Larijani’s main fields of interest include diabetes, obesity, osteoporosis, and medical ethics amongst several other interdisciplinary sciences related to endocrinology.

Early life and education
Bagher Larijani was born in the holy city of Qom in 1961. His father, the late Mirza Hashem Amoli, was one of the most renowned and influential jurisprudence scholars of his time who dedicated most of his life to research, education, and publication of several treatises and textbooks in his fields of study. Brought up in a scholarly environment, Dr. Bagher Larijani and all his siblings pursued scholarly careers and academic lifestyles. Fascinated by medicine, Professor Larijani completed his medical training at Tehran University of Medical Sciences and graduated as a doctor of medicine in 1987. After graduation from medical school, even though he was perfectly qualified to enter any residency program (cardiology, surgery, neurosurgery,…), deeply grieved by his father’s diabetes complication, he decided to pursuit his career in internal medicine and endocrinology, which he successfully fulfilled their requirements in 1990 and 1993 respectively. Since his graduation as an endocrinologist, Dr. Larijani has completed several domestic and international training courses on different aspects of endocrinology, diabetes, obesity, and osteoporosis. In 2014, he was granted a fellowship distinction (FACE) by the American Association of Clinical Endocrinologists.

Editorial positions
Dr. Larijani is the editor-in-chief of several Persian and English Medical Journals such as Journal of Diabetes and Metabolic Disorders (JDMD), Journal of Medical Ethics and History of Medicine, and Diabetes and Lipid Journal (in Persian). He also serves as the editorial board member of various journals such as Archives of Medical Science and Iranian Journal of Public Health. Besides, he has been involved in several global-scale commissions and projects. For instance, Professor Larijani has served as a commissioner in the Lancet Commission on Obesity (LCO) since 2016. As the sole commissioner from the Middle East, he played a significant role in the design and development of the final report which was ultimately published in 2019 in the Lancet. He is also the corresponding author of the article “Iran in Transition” published by the lancet in 2019. This article was the first ever collaborative manuscript published on the Iranian health system which vividly depicts more than 3000 years history of medicine and healthcare in Iran.

Executive responsibilities
He was the Chancellor of Tehran University of Medical Sciences from 2005 until 2013 when he resigned. In 2013, he was appointed the President of Medical Policy Council of the Islamic Azad University of until 2015  when he resigned and was appointed as Deputy Minister of Medical Education of Islamic Republic of Iran. In 2020, he resigned from this post due to multiple academic engagements as well as the chronic illness of his wife. He has claimed that during his time in the office, several spectacular reforms in the national medical education system was designed and implemented such as: development of a mission-oriented national medical education network, accreditation of medical universities, expansion of the continuing medical education system of the country, and establishment of a nationwide virtual learning network for medical students and other health professionals. On 2019 the data of NIMAD presented that he received one

Although he had multiple executive responsibilities at the governmental level, some authorities reported that he publishes almost a paper every five days which highlights uncertain norms in authorship.

See also
Mirza Hashem Amoli (father)
Sadegh Larijani (brother)
Ali Larijani (brother)
Mohammad Javad Larijani (brother)

References

Living people
People from Qom
People from Amol
Iranian Vice Ministers
1961 births
Iranian Science and Culture Hall of Fame recipients in Medicine